Chen Zhiqi (Chinese: 陳植棋 16 January 1906 - 13 April 1931, aged 25) was a Taiwanese painter.

Early life 

Born and raised in Sui-teng-ka (modern-day Xizhi District, Taipei), Chen Zhiqi was a forthright and bold person by nature, with noteworthy leadership abilities.

He entered Taihoku Normal School in 1921 and, in 1924, he joined Ishikawa Kinichiro’s plein air field trips. His experiences with Ishikawa inspired his paintings. In November 1924, he was expelled from school after becoming involved in a student protest. On the suggestion of Ishikawa Kinichiro and Shiotsuki Toho, he left Taiwan to study painting in Japan.

In February of 1925, he arrived in Tokyo and began studying at the Hongō Painting Institute before entering the Western Painting Division of the Tokyo School of Fine Arts. In addition to his formal classes, he also studied at the Yoshimura Painting Studio, where he was influenced by Yoshimura Yoshimatsu.

Work and public life 

During his time studying in Tokyo, he remained concerned about the development of art communities in Taiwan and made frequent trips back and forth between Taiwan and Japan. Chen became an important founder of organizations like the “Chi-Hsing Painting Society” (七星畫壇) and the “Chidao Association” (赤島社). He was both warm and generous towards others. Up and coming artists like Li Shiqiao, Hong Rui-lin, Zhang Wanchuan, and Chen Dewang all received his encouragement and went to Japan for further study. In order to gain recognition in art world, he put his extraordinary talents and efforts to the task of continually producing new works.

Between 1924 and 1931, when he died of illness, his works were selected twice for the Imperial Art Exhibition, three times for the Taiwan Art Exhibition, and three times with review exemption for the Taiwan Art Exhibition – extraordinary achievements for his brief, seven-year long career. In addition, there are records of his work having been exhibited in ten other large and small scale art exhibitions.

In April 1931, he died in Taihoku (Taipei). He was 26 years old. In September of the same year, a posthumous exhibition of Chen’s works was held in his honor at the former building of Taiwan Governor-General's Office.

Death 
In April 1931, he died in Taihoku. at the age of 26. In September of the same year, a posthumous exhibition of Chen’s works was held in his honor at the former building of Taiwan Governor-General's Office.

Painting style 
His works were primary oil paintings, and his themes included sceneries and landscapes, still lifes, and figures. His works were influenced by Post-Impressionism and Fauvism, but demonstrated a strong personal style through wild, vigorous brushwork and his bold use of color. His scenic paintings were devoted to illustrating the special characteristics of nature in Taiwan. Examples of such work include: Taiwan Landscape (Selected for the 9th Teiten in 1928) and Tamsui Landscape (selected for the 11th Teiten in 1930).

A series of portrait paintings of his wife includes works such as: Fond of Peaches (Ai Tao) (1927), My Wife (1927), and The Wife (1930~1931). These works present courageous, firm, and persistent images of Taiwanese women.

See also
Taiwanese art

References

External links

Taiwanese sculptors
Artists from New Taipei
1906 births
1931 deaths
Taiwanese painters
Taiwanese people of Hoklo descent